James Aish (born 8 November 1995) is an Australian rules footballer who plays for the Fremantle Football Club in the Australian Football League (AFL). He previously played for the Brisbane Lions from 2014 to 2015, and Collingwood from 2016 to 2019.

Early life
He is the son of former Norwood midfielder Andrew Aish, the nephew of 1981 Magarey Medallist Michael Aish and the grandson of former Norwood captain Peter Aish.

Aish broke a South Australian National Football League (SANFL) record by becoming the youngest Norwood player in 134 years to debut at league level. He was 16 on his SANFL debut at Norwood and played in SANFL premierships in both 2012 and 2013. Aish received Under 18 All-Australian honours in both 2012 and 2013. He was drafted by the Lions with their first selection, pick 7, in the 2013 AFL Draft.

AFL career
Aish was drafted by the Brisbane Lions with their first selection and 7th overall in the 2013 AFL draft. He made his debut in the opening round of the 2014 AFL season against Hawthorn where he collected 17 disposals. He collected a season-high 25 disposals (including 12 contested), laid four tackles and kicked a goal in round 6 against St Kilda, which not only helped the Lions secure their first win of the season, but also earned him a Rising Star nomination.

He went on to play in all but one of the team's 21 senior matches (he was rested from the Lions' Round 14 clash against Fremantle in Perth) and collected 20 or more disposals on nine occasions. Aish ranked 6th at the club in total disposals (370), 4th in marks (94), 5th in tackles (77), and 7th in clearances (43). He finished fourth in the NAB AFL Rising Star award - behind Lions teammate Lewis Taylor who was awarded the Ron Evans Medal - and finished ninth in his maiden Merrett-Murray Medal count.

In October 2015, he was traded to Collingwood.

He was traded to Fremantle at the conclusion of the 2019 AFL season.

Personal life
Aish is currently studying a Bachelor of Psychological Science at Deakin University.

Statistics
  Statistics are correct to the end of round 10, 2022

|- 
|- style="background-color: #eaeaea"
! scope="row" style="text-align:center" | 2014
|style="text-align:center;"|
| 4 || 21 || 6 || 6 || 185 || 185 || 370 || 94 || 77 || 0.3 || 0.3 || 8.8 || 8.8 || 17.6 || 4.5 || 3.7 || 0
|- 
! scope="row" style="text-align:center" | 2015
|style="text-align:center;"|
| 4 || 11 || 2 || 1 || 86 || 71 || 157 || 24 || 29 || 0.2 || 0.1 || 7.8 || 6.5 || 14.3 || 2.2 || 2.6 || 0
|- style="background-color: #eaeaea"
! scope="row" style="text-align:center" | 2016
|style="text-align:center;"|
| 14 || 15 || 10 || 3 || 128 || 109 || 237 || 42 || 42 || 0.7 || 0.2 || 8.5 || 7.3 || 15.8 || 2.8 || 2.8 || 1
|- 
! scope="row" style="text-align:center" | 2017
|style="text-align:center;"|
| 14 || 8 || 1 || 2 || 69 || 56 || 125 || 29 || 24 || 0.1 || 0.3 || 8.6 || 7.0 || 15.6 || 3.6 || 3.0 || 0
|- style="background-color: #eaeaea"
! scope="row" style="text-align:center" | 2018
|style="text-align:center;"|
| 14 || 13 || 4 || 3 || 130 || 92 || 222 || 47 || 38 || 0.3 || 0.2 || 10.0 || 7.1 || 17.1 || 3.6 || 2.9 || 0
|- 
! scope="row" style="text-align:center" | 2019
|style="text-align:center;"|
| 14 || 14 || 0 || 2 || 133 || 98 || 231 || 61 || 35 || 0.0 || 0.3 || 9.5 || 7.0 || 16.5 || 4.6 || 2.5 || 0
|- style="background-color: #eaeaea"
! scope="row" style="text-align:center" | 2020
|style="text-align:center;"|
| 11 || 16 || 0 || 2 || 162 || 103 || 265 || 63 || 25 || 0.0 || 0.1 || 10.1 || 6.4 || 16.6 || 3.9 || 1.6 || 0
|- 
! scope="row" style="text-align:center" | 2021
|style="text-align:center;"|
| 11 || 22 || 1 || 8 || 236 || 178 || 414 || 92 || 49 || 0.0 || 0.4 || 10.7 || 8.1 || 18.8 || 4.2 || 2.2 || 0
|- style="background-color: #eaeaea"
! scope="row" style="text-align:center" | 2022
|style="text-align:center;"|
| 11 || 9 || 0 || 2 || 98 || 80 || 178 || 40 || 21 || 0.0 || 0.2 || 10.9 || 8.9 || 19.8 || 4.4 || 2.3 || 0
|-
! colspan=3| Career
! 129
! 24
! 28
! 1227
! 972
! 2199
! 492
! 340
! 0.2
! 0.2
! 9.5
! 7.5
! 17.0
! 3.8
! 2.6
! 1
|}

Notes

References

External links

1995 births
Living people
Brisbane Lions players
Collingwood Football Club players
Fremantle Football Club players
Norwood Football Club players
Australian rules footballers from South Australia